Xinhua Township is a township of Liangzhou District, Wuwei, Gansu, People's Republic of China, located more than  south-southwest of downtown in the southern foothills of the Qilian Mountains. , it has 13 villages under its administration.

See also 
List of township-level divisions of Gansu

References 

Township-level divisions of Gansu